The 2002 CECAFA Cup was the 26th edition of the tournament. It was held in Tanzania, and was won by Kenya. The matches were played between November 30 and December 14.

Group stage

Group A

Group B

Knockout stage

Semi-finals

Third place match

Final

References
RSSSF archives

CECAFA Cup
2002
CEC
CECAFA Cup